William Patten may refer to:
William Waynflete (William Patten, c. 1398–1486), bishop of Winchester, 1447–1486, and Lord Chancellor of England, 1456–1460
William Patten (historian) (c. 1510 – after 1598), English historian and teller of the English exchequer
William Patten (zoologist) (1861–1932), American biologist and zoologist
William J. Van Patten (1848–1920), Vermont businessman and politician
Gilbert Patten (William George Patten, 1866–1945), writer

See also
William Patten Primary School in London
Bill Patten (disambiguation)
William Patton (disambiguation)
William Paton (disambiguation)